The 1972 Delaware gubernatorial election was held on November 7, 1972. Democratic nominee Sherman W. Tribbitt defeated incumbent Republican Governor Russell W. Peterson with 51.27% of the vote. This was the last time a Democrat won statewide office in Delaware until 1992, when Tom Carper (future U.S. Senator) won the gubernatorial election over Republican B. Gary Scott.

Nominations
From 1972 to 1992 Delaware used a system of “challenge” primaries, in which a candidate for statewide office who received at least 35 percent of the convention vote could challenge the endorsed candidate in a primary. Democratic nominee Tribbitt avoided such a primary in 1972.

Republican primary

Candidates

David P. Buckson, former acting Governor
Russell W. Peterson, incumbent Governor

Results

General election

Candidates
Sherman W. Tribbitt, Democratic, Delaware House of Representatives Minority leader and former Lieutenant Governor
Russell W. Peterson, Republican, incumbent Governor
Virginia M. Lyndall, American
Harry H. Conner, Prohibition

Results

References

Bibliography
 
 
 
 

1972
Delaware
Gubernatorial
November 1972 events in the United States